"Money Love" is a song performed by Swedish singer-songwriter and rapper Neneh Cherry, released in September 1992 as the first single from her second album, Homebrew (1992). The song received favorable reviews from music critics, peaking at number 17 in Cherry's native Sweden. It also peaked at number six in Greece, number 22 in the Netherlands, number 23 in the UK and number 31 in New Zealand. The picture on the cover of the single is taken by French fashion photographer and music video director Jean-Baptiste Mondino.

Critical reception
Alex Henderson from AllMusic viewed "Money Love" as a song that "decries the evils of materialism". Larry Flick from Billboard described it as a "smokin', rock-flavored hip-hopper, empowered with a more biting, worldly edge than on past efforts." He remarked "periodic rushes of metallic guitars [that] slice through a fat groove, and underscore Cherry's well-seasoned singing and rapping." David Browne from Entertainment Weekly constated that on such "brazen tracks", the singer "still knows how to throw down with the best of them." Dave Sholin from the Gavin Report commented, "Grappling with the age-old dilemma of money vs. love is made all the more compelling set to a funky, rockin' beat." Connie Johnson from Los Angeles Times felt that Cherry "still hits like a bomb", with "songs that really seem to say something about how this young Afro-Swedish singer-songwriter is living." 

Ian Gittins from Melody Maker wrote that "Money Love" was "clear-eyed and sparkling as ever, yet lacked Neneh's usual razor-sharp wit and banter". A reviewer from Music & Media stated that the singer's position "at the top of innovative pop is reaffirmed. A guitar riff on a dance record, hey that's uncommon! Rockers here's your chance to steal a sample back, instead of the other way round." James Hamilton from Music Week'''s RM Dance Update called it a "jerkily surging pop chugger". NME named it Single of the Week", complimenting it as "confident, assertive, and magnificently catchy." Charles Aaron from Spin praised the track as "flawlessly textured, heart-on-its-sleeve funk that totally levels the "Black Cat" guitar riff. Cherry cajoles, wails, and raps the hard'' sell, trying to convince herself (as much as us) that love (a.k.a. music?) is still liberating."

Track listing
"Money Love" (3:45)
"Twisted" (4:52)

Charts

References

1992 singles
1992 songs
English-language Swedish songs
Neneh Cherry songs
Song recordings produced by Jonny Dollar
Song recordings produced by Cameron McVey
Songs written by Neneh Cherry
Songs written by Jonny Dollar
Songs written by Cameron McVey
Virgin Records singles